South High School is the second-oldest high school in Pueblo City Schools (District 60) on the south side of Pueblo, Colorado, United States.

The school's colors are black and white, and the mascot is the colt.

References

External links 
 

Educational institutions established in 1959
Public high schools in Colorado
Pueblo, Colorado
Schools in Pueblo County, Colorado
Buildings and structures in Pueblo, Colorado
1959 establishments in Colorado